The 1994–95 Argentine Primera División was a season of top-flight professional football in Argentina. The league season had two champions, with River Plate winning the Apertura (26th. league title for the club), while San Lorenzo won the Clausura championship (12th. league title). Gimnasia y Esgrima de Jujuy (as champion of 1993–94 Primera B Nacional) and Talleres de Córdoba (winner of "Torneo Octogonal" after beating Instituto) promoted from the Primera B Nacional (second division).

On the other hand, Deportivo Mandiyú and Talleres (Córdoba) were relegated to Primera B Nacional.

Torneo Apertura

League standings

Top scorers

Torneo Clausura

League standings

Top scorers

Relegation

See also
1994–95 in Argentine football

References

Argentine Primera División seasons
1
Argentine
Argentine